Mohammed Iqbal Khan (born 10 February 1981), more commonly known as Iqbal Khan, is an Indian actor. He was a contestant on Fear Factor: Khatron Ke Khiladi 6.

Early life
Khan was born in Kashmir and began school in Tyndale Biscoe School, Srinagar and was further educated at Pinegrove School Dharampur, Distt. Solan. He was a part of Falguni Pathak's Indhana winava music video.

Career
After moving to Mumbai in 2001, he shot a number of music videos for T-series produced by Anubhav Sinha and directed by Anupam Sinha and Ratna Sinha (Jagjit Singh song). He then did his first film Fun2shh (released in 2003) and then Bullet (released in 2004). His television debut was as Angad Khanna in the serial Kaisa Ye Pyar Hai, this role made him an instant star.

Soon after, he went on to play the character of Shaurya in Kavyanjali and Raghu for Kahiin To Hoga. After the ending of Kaisa Ye Pyar Hai, Khan did another serial, Karam Apnaa Apnaa, playing the role of Shiv Kapoor. He left Karam Apnaa Apnaa at the end of 2006.

He made a comeback on television with Chhoona Hai Aasmaan as the air force officer Abhimanyu Adhikari. Khan appeared in Waaris and took the lead role of Rudra in the serial Sanjog Se Bani Sangini. He portrayed Dr. Viren Roy in Yahaaan Main Ghar Ghar Kheli from March to June 2012.

In 2015, Khan joined with Ekta Kapoor and was cast in a double role on a limited-episode series for Sony TV, winning two awards for it.

In July 2016, Khan was criticized for his Facebook post comparing Indian administered Kashmir with Palestine.

In 2016, Khan was also seen in &TV's show Waaris as Charan Pawania. In the same year, he joined as Akbar in Bharatvarsh and as Nawab Iqbal in Ek Tha Raja Ek Thi Rani. In 2017, he appears as a cameo in Life OK's show Bahu Hamari Rajni Kant as Super Robot. From 2017 to 2018, he enter the Star Bharat's show Kaal Bhairav Rahasya as Inder / Sethji. In 2018, he appears as Iqbal in Colors TV's show Dil Se Dil Tak and Guest in Juzz Baatt.

After a four-year absence, in February 2022 he made a comeback with Colors TV's show Nima Denzongpa where he played the role Virat Sethi. He quit the show in July 2022.

From July 2022, he is seen as a middle aged businessman, Devvrat "Dev" Raichand in Atul Kelkar's show Na Umra Ki Seema Ho on Star Bharat.

Personal life

Khan is married to Sneha Chhabra, whom he met at a shoot of a video album. They have a daughter Ammaara, who was born in 2011. They welcomed their second child, a daughter on 11 February 2022, whom they named Ifza Khan.

Filmography

Film

Television

Special appearances

Web series

Awards

Indian Telly Awards
 Best Debutant – 2005
 Most Popular Actor in Leading Role – 2006
 Best Onscreen Jodi – 2006

Zee Gold Awards
 Best Onscreen Jodi – 2014

References

External links
 
 

Indian male models
Indian male television actors
Living people
Male actors in Hindi cinema
1980 births
Kashmiri male models
Indian male soap opera actors
Kashmiri people
Kashmiri actors
Male actors from Jammu and Kashmir
21st-century Indian male actors
Actors from Mumbai
Fear Factor: Khatron Ke Khiladi participants